The Linke-Hofmann-Busch local traffic prototype coaches were a group of passenger carriages of the  Deutsche Bundesbahn.

History and usage 
In 1976, rolling stock manufacturers Waggonfabriken Linke-Hofmann-Busch – today Alstom Transport Germany – and Messerschmitt-Bölkow-Blohm built eleven prototypes of a new low-floor local traffic carriage developed by the Bundesbahn-Zentralamt in Minden. This type was supposed to be a replacement for the n carriages, a type built in great numbers from 1958 onward, which had been considered as inadequately comfortable in the 1970s. 
Their difference toward the n carriages was their lower floor height with more comfortable entrances, interior design built to higher standards with a larger seat pitch, big improvements in the heating and ventilation systems and, constructionally, a lower overall weight. The interior design combined many elements of the DB diesel units 614 and 628.0 that had been built a few years earlier. Also, different seat arrangements were trialled, contributing to the development of the x carriages S-Bahn vehicles built from 1978 onwards.

After delivery, these vehicles were nearly exclusively used in local traffic within the Großraums Hannover transport association. They were mostly used on the railway lines of the then-future StadtExpress and today's S-Bahn network; Class 141 locomotives were commonly used as tractive power.

In a time where passenger rail transport was scrutinized for cost efficiency, the LHB prototypes were relatively expensive vehicles, not least because of their more intricate interior and their lower capacity of 88 seats compared to the n carriages, which provided eight more. Hence, the Bundesbahn did not order a larger series due to the cost, and the prototypes remained the only vehicles built of this type. Instead, the n carriages were built until 1980 in a slightly improved style.

Construction 
The ten LHB coaches were built from steel, the single MBB coach from aluminium. The LHB coaches were cladded with corrugated stainless steel under license from the American Budd Company. They were built to a light-weight construction with a lower floor height and electropneumatically operated double sliding doors with folding steps, new bogies of the LD 76 type with a pneumatic shock absorber system. The prototypes also featured air heating and more comfortable seats with a larger seat pitch. Different seat types and seat assignments were trialled on the cars. The height difference between the lower floor height and the common-height gangway was bridged with ramps so they could be freely coupled to ordinary passenger carriages of the time. All carriages had an identical layout with a consistent location of the entrance doors, only the driving trailers lacked one virtual compartment at one end to make room for the rather spacious driver's cab. The driving trailers already were equipped with the unified DB driver's desk introduced with the DB Class 111 engines. Cab control was achieved by the 36-pole Konventionelle Wendezugsteuerung (KWS), the system current at the time of design.

The LHB prototypes share a close relationship with the x-carriages designed for the S-Bahn networks Rhein-Ruhr and Nuremberg that were built from 1978 onwards. Apart from the optical and constructional similarity, the low floor height, some elements of the interior, the ventilation and heating system and, with small adjustments, the bogie design were carried over to the x carriages.

Reuse for intercity push-pull trains 

In 1988, the first part of the Hanover-Würzburg high-speed line was opened to traffic, which meant a large-scale reorganisation of the InterCity network in Germany. Under the new system, Wiesbaden, the state capital of Hesse, would no longer see any InterCity services. The state government considered it inadequate to only connect the city by local trains and S-Bahn services, however, and asserted a shuttle service between Wiesbaden, Frankfurt and Mainz. DB considered the LHB prototypes and modified a number of them into InterCity carriages so that two push-pull trains became available. The two driving trailers Bnrzf732 retained their open coach seating and were rebuilt into 1st class carriages Azf209. Five coaches were rebuilt into Bz298 from the four Bnrz726 and the Bnrz727 and were equipped with the interior of the Bpmz coaches originally built for the IC '79 system.

These were the first push-pull long-distance trains on the DB network, as the first regular long-distance driving trailers were only introduced in 1995 with the Interregio driving van trailer Bimdzf269. The two push-pull trains, dubbed "Wiesbaden-City", were first used on the line between Wiesbaden Hbf and Mainz Hbf on a regular timetable. Several years later, trains between Wiesbaden Hbf and Frankfurt (Main) Hbf were also run with the two consists. Especially for these trains, several Class 141 engines were repainted to the red colour scheme current in the early 1990s. Da die umgebauten Wagen erst verspätet fertiggestellt wurden, kamen anfangs Ersatzgarnituren aus normalen Intercity-Wagen mit je einer Lok an beiden Zugenden zum Einsatz. Ein Zustand, der auch später immer wieder auftreten sollte, denn durch ihren Prototypen-Status galten sie zeitlebens als Splittergattung, die Ersatzteilhaltung wurde zuletzt zunehmend schwierig; es war nicht immer möglich, die Wagen immer ausreichend verfügbar zu halten. Often, services also were run with a mixture of retrofit and non-retrofit carriages or even ordinary passenger stock like n carriages. The driving trailers could not be used as such in the later years and were often treated as normal carriages.
In the 1990s, in addition to the scheduled Wiesbaden-City runs, the carriages also were used for nighttime airport shuttle trains from and to Karlsruhe and Düsseldorf Airport together with DB Class 111 locomotives.
In the latter part of the decade, only the nightly InterCity service Frankfurt (Main) Hbf <-> Düsseldorf Flughafen was operated with the carriages, and they were finally decommissioned by late May 1998.

Fate 
The non-rebuilt vehicles have all been scrapped, while most of the vehicles with InterCity interior have been preserved. After their usage had ended, the Wiesbaden-City carriages were first stored in Frankfurt (Main) and later distributed to various places. One of the carriages is now situated in Marne and used as a conference room. Both driving trailers are preserved in the LHB corporate museum on the factory grounds in Salzgitter.

Built coach types 
The following types were built:

The wagon classes were changed later, code letters p and b were redefined and have been dropped.

References 

Deutsche Bundesbahn
Railway coaches of Germany